Haseloff is a surname. Notable people with the surname include:

 Cynthia Haseloff (born 1948), American author
 Kurt Haseloff (1894–1978), German general in the Wehrmacht during World War II
 Reiner Haseloff (born 1954), German politician

See also
 Hasselhoff

Surnames of German origin